The Mănăileasa is a right tributary of the river Lotru in Romania. It discharges into the Lotru in Voineasa.

References

Rivers of Romania
Rivers of Vâlcea County